This article details all-time records. For a season-by-season statistical breakdown see Maidstone United F.C. seasons

This list encompasses the records set by Maidstone United, their managers and their players.

Club records

Firsts
Only first team games considered.
First home match at Central Park, Sittingbourne: Maidstone United 1-1 Kingstonian XI (Friendly, 28 July 2001)
First home match at Bourne Park, Sittingbourne: Maidstone United 0-5 Gillingham (Friendly, 20 July 2002)
First home match at The Homelands, Ashford: Maidstone United 0-2 Accrington Stanley (Friendly, 11 July 2009)
First home match at the Gallagher Stadium, Maidstone: Maidstone United 0-5 Brighton & Hove Albion (Friendly, 14 July 2012)
First Kent County League match: Maidstone United 7-0 Scott Sports Reserves (Kent County League Division Four, August 1993)
First Kent League match: Tunbridge Wells 1-1 Maidstone United (Kent League Premier Division, 11 August 2001)
First Isthmian League match: Hastings United 0-2 Maidstone United (Isthmian League Division One South, 17 August 2006)
First National League match: Sutton United 0-2 Maidstone United (National League South, 8 August 2015)
First FA Cup match: Ramsgate 1-1 Maidstone United (24 August 2002)
First FA Trophy match: Maidstone United 2-0 Bury Town (7 October 2007)
First FA Vase match: Maidstone United 4-1 Carterton Town (9 September 2001)
First Kent Senior Cup match: Maidstone United 0-3 Folkestone Invicta (17 December 2003)
First Isthmian League Cup match: Maidstone United 0-3 Tonbridge Angels (12 September 2006)
First Kent Senior Trophy match: Maidstone United 0-1 Snodland (7 October 2000)
First Kent League Premier Division Cup match: Thamesmead Town 0-1 Maidstone United (24 November 2001)

Best league position and cup runs
League position: National League (division) - 14th (2016-17)
FA Cup: 2nd round (2014-15, 2017-18, 2018-19, 2019-20)
FA Trophy: 5th round (replay) (2020-21)
FA Vase: 3rd Round (replay) (2005-06)
Kent Senior Cup: Winners (2017-18, 2018-19)
Isthmian League Cup: Winners (2013-14)
Kent Senior Trophy: Winners (2002-03)
Kent League Premier Division Cup: Winners (2001-02, 2005-06)

Record Results
Only competitive first team games considered.

Victories
Overall: 12-1 vs Aylesford - (Kent County League Division 4, 26 March 1994)
National League: 1-4 vs Macclesfield Town, (16 September 2017)
National League South: 4-0 vs St Albans City, (28 September 2019)
Isthmian League Premier Division: 7-2 vs Hampton & Richmond Borough, (25 January 2014)
Isthmian League Division One South: 6-0 vs Corinthian-Casuals, (17 February 2007)
Kent League Premier Division: 9-0 vs Sporting Bengal United, (8 April 2006)
Kent County League: 12-1 vs Aylesford, (Division Four, 26 March 1994)
FA Cup: 10-0 vs Littlehampton Town, (1st qualifying round, 13 September 2014)
FA Trophy: 5-3 vs Abingdon United, (2nd qualifying round (replay), 7 November 2007)
FA Vase: 4-0
vs AFC Totton, (2nd qualifying round, 26 September 2004)
vs North Leigh, (1st round, 29 October 2005)
vs Andover, (2nd round, 19 November 2005)
Kent Senior Cup: 3-0 vs Sittingbourne, (1st round, 26 December 2006)
Isthmian League Cup: 6-0 
vs Grays Athletic, (Semi-final, 25 February 2014)
vs Herne Bay, (2nd round, 25 November 2014)
Kent Senior Trophy: 6-0 vs Crockenhill, (round unknown, 30 November 2002)

Defeats
Overall: 0-7 vs Chelmsford City - (Isthmian League Premier Division, 25 August 2007)
National League South: 0–3 vs Chelmsford City, (2015/16)
Isthmian League Premier Division: 0-7 vs Chelmsford City, (25 August 2007)
Isthmian League Division One South: 1-5 vs Worthing, (17 December 2011)
FA Cup: 0-4 vs Ashford Town (Middlesex), (1st qualifying round, 16 September 2006)
FA Trophy: 1-3 :vs Ashford Town (Middlesex), (preliminary round, 8 October 2011)
vs Salisbury City, (2nd round, 30 January 2010)
Isthmian League Cup: 0-3
vs Tonbridge Angels, (2nd round, 12 September 2006)
vs AFC Hornchurch, (3rd Round, 18 December 2007)
vs East Thurrock United, (quarter-final, 15 February 2012)
Kent Senior Cup: 2-6 vs Ebbsfleet United, (2nd round, 24 November 2015)
Kent Senior Trophy: 3-5 vs Ramsgate, (2nd round, 27 November 2004)

Highest attendances
Overall: 4,175 vs Hampton & Richmond (National League South, 7 May 2022)
At London Road, Maidstone (1993–2001): 320 vs Snodland (Kent County League Premier Division, 16 April 2001)
At Central Park, Sittingbourne (2001–2002): 412 vs Ramsgate (Kent League Premier Division, 16 March 2002)
At Bourne Park, Sittingbourne (2002–2009, 2011-2012): 1,719 vs AFC Wimbledon (FA Cup 4th qualifying round, 25 October 2008)
At The Homelands, Ashford (2009–2011): 488 vs Folkestone Invicta (Isthmian League Premier Division, 25 April 2011)
At the Gallagher Stadium, Maidstone (2012-): 4,175 vs Hampton & Richmond (National League South, 7 May 2022)
National League (division): 3,409 vs Tranmere Rovers (29 April 2017)
National League South: 4,175 vs Hampton & Richmond (7 May 2022)
Isthmian League Premier Division: 2,296 vs Dulwich Hamlet (15 March 2014)
Isthmian League Division One South: 2,305 vs Horsham (27 April 2013)
Kent League Premier Division: 573 vs Beckenham Town (25 March 2006)
FA Cup: 3,560 vs Oldham Athletic (2nd round, 1 December 2018) 
FA Trophy: 1,571 vs Whitehawk (3rd qualifying round, 10 November 2012)
FA Vase: 423 vs Andover (3rd Round, 19 November 2005)
Kent Senior Cup: 1,612 vs Gillingham (Quarter Final, 16 January 2018)
Isthmian League Cup: 831 vs Sittingbourne (1st round, 16 October 2012) - (A crowd of 1,829 was at the Gallagher Stadium for the 2013/14 Final between Maidstone United v AFC Sudbury on 8 April 2014 although this was deemed a neutral venue)
Friendly: 4,101 vs Crystal Palace (15 July 2017)

Managerial records
First manager(s): Bill Tucker and Jack Whiteley (joint managers) - 1993-1996
Longest serving manager(s): Lloyd Hume - May 2004 - February 2010 (282 matches)

Player records

Appearances
Appearance record: Tom Mills - 341

Transfer records
Highest fee paid: £6,000 - Stuart King from Folkestone Invicta
Highest fee received: £19,000 - Chris Smalling to Fulham

Footnotes

Maidstone United F.C.